As a literary genre, the chivalric romance is a type of prose and verse narrative that was popular in the noble courts  of High Medieval and Early Modern Europe. They were fantastic stories about marvel-filled adventures, often of a chivalric knight-errant portrayed as having heroic qualities, who goes on a quest.  It developed further from the epics as time went on; in particular, "the emphasis on love and courtly manners distinguishes it from the chanson de geste and other kinds of epic, in which masculine military heroism predominates."

Popular literature also drew on themes of romance, but with ironic, satiric, or burlesque intent. Romances reworked legends, fairy tales, and history to suit the readers' and hearers' tastes, but by c. 1600 they were out of fashion, and Miguel de Cervantes famously burlesqued them in his novel Don Quixote. Still, the modern image of "medieval" is more influenced by the romance than by any other medieval genre, and the word medieval evokes knights, distressed damsels, dragons, and other romantic tropes.

Originally, romance literature was written in Old French, Anglo-Norman, Occitan, and Provençal, and later in Portuguese, Spanish, English, Italian (Sicilian poetry), and German. During the early 13th century, romances were increasingly written as prose. In later romances, particularly those of French origin, there is a marked tendency to emphasize themes of courtly love, such as faithfulness in adversity.

Form
Unlike the later form of the novel and like the chansons de geste, the genre of romance dealt with traditional themes.  These were distinguished from earlier epics by heavy use of marvelous events, the elements of love, and the frequent use of a web of interwoven stories, rather than a simple plot unfolding about a main character.  The earliest forms were invariably in verse, but the 15th century saw many in prose, often retelling the old, rhymed versions.

The romantic form pursued the wish-fulfillment dream where the heroes and heroines were considered representations of the ideals of the age while the villains embodied the threat to their ascendancy. There is also a persistent archetype, which involved a hero's quest. This quest or journey served as the structure that held the narrative together. With regards to the structure, scholars recognize the similarity of the romance to folk tales. Vladimir Propp identified a basic form for this genre and it involved an order that began with initial situation, then followed by departure, complication, first move, second move, and resolution. This structure is also applicable to romance narratives.

Cycles

Overwhelmingly, these were linked in some way, perhaps only in an opening frame story, with three thematic cycles of tales: these were assembled in imagination at a late date as the "Matter of Rome" (actually centered on the life and deeds of Alexander the Great conflated with the Trojan War), the "Matter of France" (Charlemagne and Roland, his principal paladin) and the "Matter of Britain" (the lives and deeds of King Arthur and the Knights of the Round Table, within which was incorporated the quest for the Holy Grail); medieval authors explicitly described these as comprising all romances.

In reality, a number of "non-cyclical" romances were written without any such connection; these include such romances as King Horn, Robert the Devil, Ipomadon,  Emaré, Havelok the Dane,Roswall and Lillian, Le Bone Florence of Rome, and Amadas.

Indeed, some tales are found so often that scholars group them together as the "Constance cycle" or the "Crescentia cycle"—referring not to a continuity of character and setting, but to the recognizable plot.

Sources
Many influences are clear in the forms of chivalric romance.

Folklore and folktales
The earliest medieval romances dealt heavily with themes from folklore, which diminished over time, though remaining a presence. Many early tales had the knight, such as Sir Launfal, meet with fairy ladies, and Huon of Bordeaux is aided by King Oberon, but these fairy characters were transformed, more and more often, into wizards and enchantresses. Morgan le Fay never loses her name, but in Le Morte d'Arthur, she studies magic rather than being inherently magical. Similarly, knights lose magical abilities. Still, fairies never completely vanished from the tradition. Sir Gawain and the Green Knight is a late tale, but the Green Knight himself is an otherworldly being.

Early persecuted heroines were often driven from their husbands' homes by the persecutions of their mothers-in-law, whose motives are seldom delineated, and whose accusations are of the heroines' having borne monstrous children, committed infanticide, or practiced witchcraft — all of which appear in such fairy tales as The Girl Without Hands and many others. As time progressed, a new persecutor appeared: a courtier who was rejected by the woman or whose ambition requires her removal, and who accuses her of adultery or high treason, motifs not duplicated in fairy tales.  While he never eliminates the mother-in-law, many romances such as Valentine and Orson have later variants that change from the mother-in-law to the courtier, whereas a more recent version never goes back.

In Italy there is the story called Il Bel Gherardino. It is the most ancient prototype of an Italian singing fairy tale by an anonymous Tuscan author. It tells the story of a young Italian knight, depleted for its "magnanimitas", who wins the love of a fairy. When he loses this love because he does not comply with her conditions, Gherardino reconquers his lady after a series of labours, including the prison where he is rescued by another woman and a tournament that he wins. Other examples of Italian (Tuscan) poetry tales are Antonio Pucci's literature: Gismirante, Il Brutto di Bretagna or Brito di Bretagna ("The ugly knight of Britain") and Madonna Lionessa ("Lioness Lady"). Another work of a second anonymous Italian author that is worth mentioning is Istoria di Tre Giovani Disperati e di Tre Fate ("Story of three desperate boys and three fairies").

Religious practices
The Arthurian cycle as a Medieval work has also been noted to contains many magical or supernatural references. Drawing from many different sources, some notable allusions include elements of Christianity (an example being the multiple references to the Holy Grail) as well as elements of Celtic legends.

Medieval epic
The Medieval romance developed out of the medieval epic, in particular the Matter of France developing out of such tales as the Chanson de Geste, with intermediate forms where the feudal bonds of loyalty had giants, or a magical horn, added to the plot.  The epics of Charlemagne, unlike such ones as Beowulf, already had feudalism rather than the tribal loyalties; this was to continue in romances.

Contemporary society
The romance form is distinguished from the earlier epics of the Middle Ages by the changes of the 12th century, which introduced courtly and chivalrous themes into the works. This occurred regardless of congruity to the source material; Alexander the Great featured as a fully feudal king. Chivalry was treated as continuous from Roman times. This extended even to such details as clothing; when in the Seven Sages of Rome, the son of an (unnamed) emperor of Rome wears the clothing of a sober Italian citizen, and when his stepmother attempts to seduce him, her clothing is described in medieval terminology.  When Priam sends Paris to Greece in a 14th-century work, Priam is dressed in the mold of Charlemagne, and Paris is dressed demurely, but in Greece, he adopts the flashier style, with multicolored clothing and fashionable shoes, cut in lattice-work—signs of a seducer in the era.

Historical figures reappeared, reworked, in romance.  The entire Matter of France derived from known figures, and suffered somewhat because their descendants had an interest in the tales that were told of their ancestors, unlike the Matter of Britain.  Richard Coeur de Lion reappeared in romance, endowed with a fairy mother who arrived in a ship with silk sails and departed when forced to behold the sacrament, bare-handed combat with a lion, magical rings, and prophetic dreams. Hereward the Wake's early life appeared in chronicles as the embellished, romantic adventures of an exile, complete with rescuing princesses and wrestling with bears.  Fulk Fitzwarin, an outlaw in King John's day, has his historical background a minor thread in the episodic stream of romantic adventures.

Classical origins
Some romances, such as Apollonius of Tyre, show classical pagan origins. Tales of the Matter of Rome in particular may be derived from such works as the Alexander Romance.  Ovid was used as a source for tales of Jason and Medea, which were cast in romance in a more fairy-tale like form, probably closer to the older forms than Ovid's rhetoric. It also drew upon the traditions of magic that were attributed to such figures as Virgil.

Courtly love
The new courtly love was not one of the original elements of the genre, but quickly became very important when introduced.

It was introduced to the romance by Chretien de Troyes, combining it with the Matter of Britain, new to French poets.  In Lancelot, the Knight of the Cart (unlike his earlier Erec and Enide), the behavior of Lancelot conforms to the courtly love ideal; it also, though still full of adventure, devotes an unprecedented amount of time to dealing with the psychological aspects of the love.  By the end of the 14th century, counter to the earliest formulations, many French and English romances combined courtly love, with love sickness and devotion on the man's part, with the couple's subsequent marriage; this featured in Sir Degrevant, Sir Torrent of Portyngale, Sir Eglamour, and William of Palerne.  Ipomadon even explicitly describes the married couple as lovers, and the plot of Sir Otuel was altered, to allow him to marry Belyssant. Similarly, Iberian romances of the 14th century praised monogamy and marriage in such tales as Tirant lo Blanc and Amadís de Gaula.

Early forms

Many medieval romances recount the marvellous adventures of a chivalrous, heroic knight, often of super-human ability, who, abiding chivalry's strict codes of honor and demeanor, goes on a quest, and fights and defeats monsters and giants, thereby winning favor with a lady.   The Matter of France, most popular early, did not lend itself to the subject of courtly love, but rather dealt with heroic adventure: in The Song of Roland, Roland, though betrothed to Oliver's sister, does not think of her during the course of events. The themes of love were, however, to soon appear, particularly in the Matter of Britain, leading to even the French regarding King Arthur's court as the exemplar of true and noble love, so much so that even the earliest writers about courtly love would claim it had reached its true excellence there, and love was not what it was in King Arthur's day.   A perennial theme was the rescue of a lady from the imperiling monster, a theme that would remain throughout the romances of the medieval era.

Originally, this literature was written in Old French, Anglo-Norman and Occitan, later, in Spanish, English and German – amongst the important Spanish texts were Cantar de Mio Cid and Book of the Knight Zifar; notable later English works being King Horn (a translation of the Anglo-Norman (AN) Romance of Horn of Mestre Thomas), and Havelok the Dane (a translation of the anonymous AN Lai d'Haveloc); around the same time Gottfried von Strassburg's version of the Tristan of Thomas of Britain (a different Thomas to the author of 'Horn') and Wolfram von Eschenbach's Parzival translated classic French romance narrative into the German tongue.

Forms of the High Middle Ages 
During the early 13th century, romances were increasingly written as prose, and extensively amplified through cycles of continuation.  These were collated in the vast, polymorphous manuscript witnesses comprising what is now known as the Vulgate Cycle, with the romance of La Mort le Roi Artu c. 1230, perhaps its final installment.  These texts, together with a wide range of further Arthurian material, such as that found in the anonymous cycle of English Brut Chronicles, comprised the bases of Malory's Morte d'Arthur.  Prose literature thus increasingly dominated the expression of romance narrative in the later Middle Ages, at least until the resurgence of verse during the high Renaissance in the oeuvres of Ludovico Ariosto, Torquato Tasso, and Edmund Spenser.

In Old Norse, they are the prose riddarasögur or chivalric sagas.  The genre began in thirteenth-century Norway with translations of French chansons de geste; it soon expanded to similar indigenous creations. The early fourteenth century saw the emergence of Scandinavian verse romance in Sweden under the patronage of Queen Euphemia of Rügen, who commissioned the Eufemiavisorna.

Another trend of the high Middle Ages was the allegorical romance, inspired by the wildly popular Roman de la Rose.

Late Medieval and Renaissance forms

In late medieval and Renaissance high culture, the important European literary trend was to fantastic fictions in the mode of Romance. Exemplary work, such as the English Le Morte d'Arthur  by Sir Thomas Malory (c. 1408–1471), the Catalan Tirant lo Blanch, and the Castilian or Portuguese Amadís de Gaula (1508), spawned many imitators, and the genre was popularly well-received, producing such masterpiece of Renaissance poetry as Ludovico Ariosto's Orlando furioso and Torquato Tasso's Gerusalemme Liberata and other 16th-century literary works in the romance genre.  The romances were freely drawn upon for royal pageantry.  Queen Elizabeth I's Accession Day tilts, for instance, drew freely on the multiplicity of incident from romances for the knights' disguises.  Knights even assumed the names of romantic figures, such as the Swan Knight, or the coat-of-arms of such figures as Lancelot or Tristan.

From the high Middle Ages, in works of piety, clerical critics often deemed romances to be harmful worldly distractions from more substantive or moral works, and by 1600 many secular readers would agree; in the judgement of many learned readers in the shifting intellectual atmosphere of the 17th century, the romance was trite and childish literature, inspiring only broken-down ageing and provincial persons such as Don Quixote, knight of the culturally isolated province of La Mancha. (Don Quixote [1605, 1615], by Miguel de Cervantes [1547–1616],  is a satirical story of an elderly country gentleman, living in La Mancha province, who is so obsessed by chivalric romances that he seeks to emulate their various heroes.) Hudibras also lampoons the faded conventions of chivalrous romance, from an ironic, consciously realistic viewpoint. Some of the magical and exotic atmosphere of Romance informed tragedies for the stage, such as John Dryden's collaborative The Indian Queen (1664) as well as Restoration spectaculars  and opera seria, such as Handel's Rinaldo (1711), based on a magical interlude in Tasso's Gerusalemme liberata.

In the Renaissance, also, the romance genre was bitterly attacked as barbarous and silly by the humanists, who exalted Greek and Latin classics and classical forms, an attack that was not in that century very effective among the common readers. In England, romances continued; heavily rhetorical, they often had complex plots and high sentiment, such as in Robert Greene's Pandosto (the source for William Shakespeare's The Winter's Tale) and Thomas Lodge's Rosalynde (based on the medieval romance Gamelyn and the source for As You Like It), Robert Duke of Normandy (based on Robert the Devil) and A Margarite of America.

Related forms
The Acritic songs (dealing with Digenis Acritas and his fellow frontiersmen) resemble much the chanson de geste, though they developed simultaneously but separately. These songs dealt with the hardships and adventures of the border guards of the Eastern Roman Empire (Byzantium) – including their love affairs – and where a predominantly oral tradition which survived in the Balkans and Anatolia until modern times. This genre may have intermingled with its Western counterparts during the long occupation of Byzantine territories by French and Italian knights after the 4th crusade. This is suggested by later works in the Greek language which show influences from both traditions.

Relationship to modern "romantic fiction"

In later romances, particularly those of French origin, there is a marked tendency to emphasize themes of courtly love, such as faithfulness in adversity. From c. 1760 – usually cited as 1764 at the publication of Horace Walpole's The Castle of Otranto – the connotations of "romance" moved from fantastic and eerie, somewhat Gothic adventure narratives of novelists like Ann Radcliffe's A Sicilian Romance (1790) or The Romance of the Forest (1791) with erotic content to novels centered on the episodic development of a courtship that ends in marriage. With a female protagonist, during the rise of Romanticism the depiction of the course of such a courtship within contemporary conventions of realism, the female equivalent of the "novel of education", informs much Romantic fiction. In gothic novels such as Bram Stoker's Dracula, the elements of romantic seduction and desire were mingled with fear and dread.  Nathaniel Hawthorne used the term to distinguish his works as romances rather than novels, and literary criticism of the 19th century often accepted the contrast between the romance and the novel, in such works as H. G. Wells's "scientific romances" in the beginning of science fiction.

In 1825, the fantasy genre developed when the Swedish literary work Frithjof's saga, which was based on the Friðþjófs saga ins frœkna, became successful in England and Germany. It was translated twenty-two times into English, 20 times into German, and into many other European languages, including modern Icelandic in 1866. Their influence on authors such as J. R. R. Tolkien, William Morris and Poul Anderson and on the subsequent modern fantasy genre is considerable.

Modern usage of term "romance" usually refer to the romance novel, which is a subgenre that focuses on the relationship and romantic love between two people; these novels must have an "emotionally satisfying and optimistic ending."

Despite the popularity of this popular meaning of Romance, other works are still referred to as romances because of their uses of other elements descended from the medieval romance, or from the Romantic movement:  larger-than-life heroes and heroines, drama and adventure, marvels that may become fantastic, themes of honor and loyalty, or fairy-tale-like stories and story settings.  Shakespeare's later comedies, such as The Tempest or The Winter's Tale are sometimes called his romances.  Modern works may differentiate from love-story as romance into different genres, such as planetary romance or Ruritanian romance.  Science fiction was, for a time, termed scientific romance, and gaslamp fantasy is sometimes termed gaslight romance.  Flannery O'Conner, writing of the use of grotesque in fiction, talked of its use in "the modern romance tradition."

See also
Examples:

 Romances of Chrétien de Troyes
Queste del Saint Graal
Perceforest
The Knight in the Panther's Skin
Valentine and Orson
King Horn
The Squire of Low Degree
Romance of the Rose
Sir Gawain and the Green Knight
Guilhem de la Barra by Arnaut Vidal
Guillaume de Palerme
Le Morte D'Arthur – Sir Thomas Malory
Amadís de Gaula – Garci Rodríguez de Montalvo
"The Knight's Tale" and "The Wife of Bath's Tale" from Geoffrey Chaucer's The Canterbury Tales
Chevalere Assigne
 Sir Eglamour of Artois
 Octavian
 Ipomadon
 Sir Gawain and the Carle of Carlisle
 The Knightly Tale of Gologras and Gawain
 Tirant lo Blanch – Joanot Martorell
 Amadas
 Sir Cleges
 The King of Tars
 Sir Isumbras
 Erl of Toulouse
 Generides
 Roswall and Lillian
 Hertig Fredrik av Normandie
 Orlando Innamorato
 Orlando Furioso – Ludovico Ariosto

 Post-medieval interpretations:

 The Faerie Queene
 Don Quixote
 Il palazzo incantato
  Prince Arthur and King Arthur – Richard Blackmore
 King Arthur – John Dryden and Henry Purcell
 Orlando, Alcina, and Ariodante – George Frideric Handel
 Orlando paladino
 Ivanhoe
 La Belle Dame sans Merci
 The Lady of Shalott, Sir Galahad, and Idylls of the King — Alfred, Lord Tennyson
 Tannhäuser, Lohengrin, Tristan und Isolde, and Parsifal – Richard Wagner
 A Connecticut Yankee in King Arthur's Court
 The Well at the World's End
 The King of Elfland's Daughter
 The Hobbit and The Lord of the Rings – J. R. R. Tolkien
 Princess Knight
 The Once and Future King
 El Cid
 The Sword in the Stone
 Monty Python and the Holy Grail
 The Dark Tower
 Camelot 3000
 Fate/stay night

Similar or related

 Adventure fiction
 Beowulf
 Chinese knight-errant
 Fairy tale
 Iconography of Charlemagne
 Irish mythology: Ulster cycle, Fenian cycle, and Cycles of the Kings
 Heroic fantasy
 Medievalism
 Nibelungenlied
 Nine Worthies
 Pas d'armes
 Picaresque
 Pre-Raphaelite Brotherhood
 Romance of the Three Kingdoms
 Samurai cinema
 Swashbuckler
 Sword and sorcery
 The Tale of Igor's Campaign
 Troubadour
 Western
 Wuxia

References

External links

The International Courtly Literature Society

Fiction by genre
Literary genres
Romance genres
Literary theory

Traditional stories